Cornelis Alexander Gubbels (21 September 1898 – 24 January 1975) was a Dutch racewalker. He competed in the men's 3000 metres walk at the 1920 Summer Olympics.

References

External links
 

1898 births
1975 deaths
Athletes (track and field) at the 1920 Summer Olympics
Dutch male racewalkers
Olympic athletes of the Netherlands
Place of birth missing
19th-century Dutch people
20th-century Dutch people